Devosia enhydra is a bacterium from the genus of Devosia.

References

External links
Type strain of Devosia enhydra at BacDive -  the Bacterial Diversity Metadatabase

Hyphomicrobiales
Bacteria described in 1968